Poland's 43rd Senate district is one of 100 Polish Senate districts which elect one member of the Senate using first-past-the-post voting. It is currently represented by Barbara Borys-Damięcka of the Civic Platform.

The district was created in 2011 when the Polish Senate moved from multi-member constituencies to single-member constituencies.

District profile 
The district encompasses four districts of Warsaw: Mokotów, Ursynów, Wawer and Wilanów.

Members of Senate

Election Results
 

  | style="background-color: " |
  |PD
  | Andrzej Celiński
  | align="right"|64,829
  | align="right"|25.4
  | align="right"|-
  |-

| style="background-color: " | 
  | PO (KO)
  | Barbara Borys-Damięcka
  | align="right"|157,359
  | align="right"|53.1
  | align="right"|+10.5

  | style="background-color: Red" |
  |PL
  | Monika Jaruzelska
  | align="right"|57,946
  | align="right"|19.6
  | align="right"|-
  |-

References

43
Politics of Warsaw